Eva is a 2010 Romanian drama film directed by Adrian Popovici. It premiered on 20 May 2010 at the Cannes Film Festival.

Plot

As Europe reels amidst the Second World War, Eva faces immense tragedy as she struggles for love and her own survival.

Cast
 Amy Beth Hayes as Eva
 Patrick Bergin as Oswald
 Dustin Milligan as Lucien
 Maia Morgenstern as Maria
 Vlad Rădescu as Gunther
 Claudiu Bleonț as Doctor
 Vanessa Redgrave as Eva
 Vincent Regan as Tudor
 Michael Ironside as Alfonse
 Corin Redgrave

References

External links
 

2010 films
English-language Romanian films
2010s historical drama films
Romanian World War II films
Romanian historical drama films
2010 drama films
2010s English-language films